S. V. Krishnan was an Indian politician and former Member of the Legislative Assembly. He was elected to the Tamil Nadu legislative assembly as a Communist Party of India candidate from Nanguneri constituency in 1996 election.

References 

Communist Party of India (Marxist) politicians from Tamil Nadu
Living people
Year of birth missing (living people)
Tamil Nadu MLAs 1996–2001